The Council of Ireland was a body established under the Government of Ireland Act 1920, initially with jurisdiction over both Northern Ireland and Southern Ireland.

Council of Ireland may also refer to 
 Privy Council of Ireland, de jure Irish government from the English conquest until 1921, and often called "Council of Ireland" in earlier centuries.
 Council of Ireland (1970s) short-lived cross-border body established under the Sunningdale Agreement

See also
 Irish Council (disambiguation)